South Korea's Ministry of Culture, Sports and Tourism (MCST) is a central government agency responsible for the areas of tourism, culture, art, religion, and sports. It has two vice ministers, three assistant ministers, one commission, and over 60 divisions.  The first Minister of Culture was novelist Lee O-young.

Subsidiary entities such as the National Museum, the National Theater, and the National Library are under the Ministry.

The headquarters are located in the Sejong Government Complex in Sejong City. The headquarters were previously in Jongno District, Seoul.

Goals
The main goals of the MCST are:
To educate Korean people to be cultured and creative citizens
To create a society in which leisure and work are in harmony
To create a dynamic nation in which various local cultures are represented
To enhance public awareness of the national agenda (e.g. green growth) through public relations activities
To improve quality of life for citizens by supporting cultural events and activities, sports, tourism, and religious activities

History
The Ministry of Culture and Tourism was originally a sub-organization of the Ministry of Education created in 1948. Later, the Ministry of Transportation set up a tourism department. The Ministry of Information was set up in 1961 for administration of art and cultural affairs. The Ministry of Culture and Information became the Ministry of Culture in 1990.

In 1993, the Ministry of Culture was integrated with the Ministry of Youth and Sports to become the Ministry of Culture and Sports. In 1998, as part of government reorganization efforts, the Ministry of Culture and Sports was replaced by the Ministry of Culture and Tourism. It was created to invest in and support the entertainment industry, as Korea needed new areas of growth in the wake of the Asian financial crisis in the 1990s.

President Kim Dae Jung put forth industrial policies supporting entertainment with the same regard as traditional industrial sectors such as manufacturing. Investments were made in both infrastructure and technology to support K-Pop, including concert halls and visual effects technology. In addition, government regulation of karaoke bars favored K-Pop.

Since then, there has been a focus on developing soft power; the Ministry believes that by promoting Korean culture abroad, exports of other goods and services will also increase. As part of those efforts to move beyond developing a domestic industry and toward international success, the Ministry established an advisory committee and announced an international training school. Direct financial support of artists increased. In 2013, the Ministry allocated 319 billion won (US$280 million) for direct support of Hallyu (Korean Wave). Cultural exports increased at an annual rate of 10 percent as a result of these efforts.

Ministers
 29 February 2008 - 26 January 2011 Yu In-chon (유인촌)
 27 January 2011 - 19 September 2011 Choung Byoung-gug (정병국)
 2 September 2011 - 10 March 2013 Choe Kwang-shik (최광식)
 11 March 2013 - 16 July 2014 Yoo Jin-ryong
 August 21, 2014 – September 4, 2016 Kim Jong-deok
 5 September 2016 – 21 January 2017 Cho Yoon-sun
 10 June 2017– 3 April 2019 Do Jong-hwan
3 April 2019 - 10 February 2021 Park Yang-woo
11 February 2021 - present Hwang Hee

Korean Culture and Information Service

The Korean Culture and Information Service is a department of the MCST that aims to bring Korean culture closer to the rest of the world while improving the national image of Korea. It is also responsible for setting up more than 20 Korean Cultural Centers around the world.

Criticisms
Despite the large amounts of money the government provides for Hallyu, the K-Pop industry, the most internationally well-known part of Hallyu has criticized the Ministry's efforts. Many industries such as fashion and food have lobbied the government for inclusion in the Hallyu budget, and politicians and the bureaucracy also have varying interests in how the budget is distributed. Despite popular internet speculation on the Korean government's financial support for the promotion of K-Pop, there are no figures to substantiate the speculation. In 2013, of the $230 million allocated for Hallyu, there are itemized contributions to the promotion of the Korean language, culture and food but no known figures for allocations directly to K-Pop.  Independent of financial support in recent years the Ministry has been successful in reversing decades-long governmental policy of suppressing and jailing pop and gayo artists in favor of supporting K-Pop as a driver of Hallyu overseas.

See also 
 Korean Film Council
 Korea Copyright Commission

Notes and references

External links

South Korean Ministry of Culture and Tourism official website
South Korean Ministry of Culture and Tourism official website 

Government ministries of South Korea
S
S
S